Sugguna Lanka is a village in Kollur mandal, located in Guntur district of Andhra Pradesh in India.  The name of this village is derived from the Lastname Sugguna.

Sugguna Lanka is a Village in Kollur Mandal in Guntur District of Andhra Pradesh, India. It is located 48 km towards East from District headquarters Guntur, 25 km from Tenali,  8 km from Kolluru, 326 km from Hyderabad.

Sugguna Lanka Pin code is 521247 and postal head office is Meduru .

Annavarapu Lanke ( 2 km ), Chilumuru ( 3 km ), Pedalanka ( 4 km ), Ananthavaram ( 5 km ), Kolluru ( 6 km ) are the nearby Villages to Sugguna Lanka. Sugguna Lanka is a village surrounded by Pamidimukkala Mandal in the, Vemuru Mandal in the West, Kollipara Mandal in the West, Thotlavalluru Mandal in North-West .

Tenali, Repalle, Gudivada, Machilipatnam are the nearby major towns to Sugguna Lanka.	

This Place is in the border of the Guntur District and Krishna District. Krishna District Movva lies in the East of this place.

Language 
Telugu is the Local Language here.

Transport

By Rail 
Vemuru Railway Station is the nearest Railway Station to Sugguna Lanka. Chinnaravuru Railway Station (near to Tenali) on the Repalle line, Palikona Railway Station near Repalle, Tenali Railway Station (Junction near Tenali). However Vijayawada Railway Junction is major railway station which is 42 km to Sugguna Lank.

By Road 
Repalle, Tenali are the nearby towns to Sugguna Lanka having road connectivity to Sugguna Lanka

By Bus 
Kolluru APSRTC Bus Station, Kodali APSRTC Bus Station, Muvva APSRTC Bus Station are the nearby Bus Stations to Sugguna Lanka. APSRTC runs Number of buses from major towns to here.

Colleges 
K V S R T Jr College
Address : Chilumuru

Schools 
Arvindasri School
Address : Chilumuru , Kolluru , Guntur , Andhra Pradesh - 522301 , Post - Anantavaram

Sri Rama Rural High School
Address : Chilumuru , Kolluru , Guntur , Andhra Pradesh - 522301 , Post - Anantavaram

ZPHS Ananthavaram
Address : Ananthavaram , Kolluru , Guntur District , Andhra Pradesh - 522301 , Post - Anantavaram

Bus Stops
Patamata Lankapalli Bus Stop  at a distance of about 4.4 km
A.V.G. Palem Bus Stop 
Annavaram Bus Stop  at a distance of about 4.7 km
Iluru Bus Stop at a distance of about 5.0 km
Kuderu Bus Stop  at a distance of about 5.4 km

ATMs 
Main road; Inapuru; Andhra Pradesh 521247; India at a distance of 3.8 km 
Andhra Bank ATM, Ananthavaram; Andhra Pradesh 522301; India at a distance of  4.9 km 
State Bank ATM, Kolluru; Andhra Pradesh 522324; India  at a distance of 6.3 km
State Bank ATM, Meduru; Andhra Pradesh 521247; India at a distance of 7.7 km distance

CINEMA HALLS
Srinivasa Cinema Hall, Kolluru; Andhra Pradesh 522324; at a distance of 6.0 km 
Shivaram theatre, Guntur; Andhra Pradesh 522301; at a distance of 9.6 km 
Satyanarayana Talkies, Vemuru; Andhra Pradesh 522261; at distance of 10.9 km
Sivaram Theatre, Buthumalli Adda Road; Kollipara; Andhra Pradesh 522261; at a distance of 12.0 km

TEMPLES
Siva Alayam Temples in Sugguna Lanka; Andhra Pradesh 521247; at a distance of 0.7 km 
Ankamma Talli Temple, Sugguna Lanka; Andhra Pradesh 521247; at a distance of 0.7 km
రామ మందిరం, Sugguna Lanka; Andhra Pradesh 521247; at a distance of 0.7 km
శ్రీరామ మందిరం; కాపులూరు,  Yadlapalli; Andhra Pradesh 522301; at a distance of 0.8 km

References

Villages in Guntur district